Parliamentary elections were held in Cameroon on 17 May 1997. The result was a victory for the ruling Cameroon People's Democratic Movement, which won 116 of the 180 seats, including seven constituencies in which the result had originally been cancelled by the Supreme Court due to serious irregularities and the election re-run.

Results

References

Cameroon
1997 in Cameroon
Elections in Cameroon
Election and referendum articles with incomplete results
May 1997 events in Africa